USAM Nîmes is a French handball team based in Nîmes, that plays in the LNH Division 1.

Crest, colours, supporters

Naming history

Kit manufacturers

Kits

Results
LNH Division 1:
Winners: (4) 1988, 1990, 1991, 1993
Runner-Up: (4) 1986, 1987, 1989, 1994
Coupe de France:
Winners: 1985, 1986, 1994 
Finalists: 1989, 2018
EHF Champions League:
Semiinalists: 1994

Team

Current squad 

Squad for the 2022–23 season

Transfers
Transfers for the 2023–24 season

Joining
  Reyhan Zuzo (CB) (from  Villeurbanne HB)
  Mohab Abdelhak (RB) (from  Al Ahly)

Leaving
  Ahmed Hesham (CB) (to  Montpellier Handball)

Former club members

Notable former players

  Jean-Jacques Acquevillo (2019–)
  Cédric Burdet (2009-2010)
  Rémi Desbonnet (2013–2022)
  Philippe Debureau (1994-1996)
  Yohan Delattre (1993-1994)
  Gilles Derot (1983–1994)
  Grégoire Detrez (2001–2008)
  Benjamin Gallego (2010–)
  Dylan Garain (2018–2019)
  Philippe Gardent (1990–1992)
  Christian Gaudin (1987–1994)
  Andrej Golić (1991-1992)
  Michaël Guigou (2019–2022)
  Franck Junillon (2010-2012)
  Christophe Kempé (1995–1996)
  Guéric Kervadec (1993–1994)
  Denis Lathoud (1992-1994)
  Olivier Marroux (2014–2017)
  Bruno Martini (2005-2007)
  Olivier Maurelli (1998–2000)
  Franck Maurice (1999–2002)
  Philippe Médard (1989-1992)
  Quentin Minel (2020–)
  O'Brian Nyateu (2017–)
  Alain Portes (1982-1994)
  Elohim Prandi (2017-2020)
  Julien Rebichon  (2005–)
  Guillaume Saurina (2006–2010, 2011-2016)
  Stéphane Stoecklin (1990–1994)
  Luc Tobie (2016–)
  Frédéric Volle (1980–1992)
  Malik Boubaiou (2006–2013)
  Micke Brasseleur (2018–2020)
  Hichem Kaabeche (2017–2018, 2019-2020)
  Abdelkader Rahim (2013–2015)
  Zlatko Saračević (1991-1994)
  Mirza Šarić (2005-2006)
  Irfan Smajlagić (1993-1994)
  Ahmed Hesham (2020-)
  Mohammad Sanad (2017-)
  Garcia Alberto Aguirrezabalaga (2014-2017)
  Attila Borsos (1991-1992)
  Snorri Guðjónsson (2015-2017)
  Ásgeir Örn Hallgrímsson (2014-2018)
  Ragnar Þór Óskarsson (2007-2008)
  Yassine Idrissi (2000-2008, 2011-2016)
  Henrik Jakobsen (2021-)
  Sorin Toacsen (1995-1996, 2000-2003)
  Vid Kavtičnik (2020-2021)
  Aljoša Rezar (2016-2017)
  Stevan Sretenović (2016-2017)
  Teodor Paul (2017-2022)
  Heykel Megannem (2005-2007)

Former coaches

External links
 
 

USAM Nîmes
Sport in Nîmes
1960 establishments in France
Handball clubs established in 1960